A jathedar is a leader of high regard chosen to head and ensure discipline within a jatha, a body of Sikhs.

The Jathedar of the Akal Takht is the central head of the Sikhs worldwide, who makes all important decisions after consultation with the jathedars of the other four takhts. The current Jathedar of the Akal Takht is Jagtar Singh Hawara, who was appointed by the Sarbat Khalsa on 10 November 2015. Due to the political imprisonment of Hawara, Dhian Singh Mand appointed by the Sarbat Khalsa and Harpreet Singh appointed by Shiromani Gurdwara Parbandhak Committee have been serving as the acting jathedars.

Jathedars of the Akal Takht

 Gurdas Bhalla 
 Mani Singh 
 Darbara Singh 
 Kapur Singh Virk 
 Jassa Singh Ahluwalia 
 Phula Singh 
 Hanuman Singh 
 Prahlad Singh 
 Arur Singh Naushehra 
 Teja Singh Bhuchar 
 Teja Singh Akarpuri  & 
 Udham Singh Nagoke  & 
 Acchar Singh  & 
 Didar Singh  
 Jawaher Singh Mattu Bhaike 
 Gurmukh Singh Musafir 
 Wasakha Singh Dadehar 
 Mohan Singh Nagoke 
 Partap Singh  
 Mohan Singh Tur 
 Sadhu Singh Bhaura 
 Kirpal Singh  
 Gurdial Singh Ajnoha 
 Jasbir Singh Rode 
 Gurdev Singh Kaunke 
 Gurbachan Singh Manochahal 
 Darshan Singh   
 Manjit Singh 
 Ranjit Singh 
 Puran Singh 
 Joginder Singh Vadanti 
 Gurbachan Singh 
 Jagtar Singh Hawara 
 Dhian Singh Mand 
 Harpreet Singh

Jathedars of Takht Kesgarh Sahib 

 Karam Singh
 Kharak Singh
 Budh Singh
 Puran Singh
 Puran Singh
 Resham Singh 
 Partap Singh
 Bir Singh
 Ajit Singh
 Fauja Singh
 Bachitar Singh
 Guridal Singh
 Harcharan Singh
 Shavinder Singh
 Balbir Singh
 Manjit Singh
 Tarlochan Singh
 Amrik Singh
 Amrik Singh Ajnala 
 Raghbir Singh

Jathedars of Takht Damdama Sahib 

 Deep Singh
 Sudh Singh
 Karam Singh
 Natha Singh
 Ran Singh
 Bhagwaan Singh
 Baghel Singh
 Diwan Singh
 Ram Singh
 Harchand Singh Longowal
 Jagir Singh
 Sabh Lakha Singh
 Jaswant Singh
 Sanjh Hakam Singh
 Mehar Singh
 Kewal Singh
 Balwant Singh Nandgarh
 Gurmukh Singh
 Baljit Singh Daduwal 
 Harpreet Singh

Jathedars of Takht Patna Sahib

 Iqbal Singh 
 Ranjit Singh 
 Baldev Singh

Jathedars of Takht Hazur Sahib

 Santokh Singh 
 Khushal Singh 
 Lal Singh 
 Bakhtawar Singh 
 Charat Singh 
 Mohar Singh 
 Ram Singh 
 Dharam Singh 
 Charat Singh 
 Sahib Singh 
 Aaya Singh 
 Jassa Singh 
 Isher Singh 
 Waryam Singh 
 Tara Singh 
 Atar Singh 
 Prem Singh 
 Deva Singh 
 Brij Singh 
 Jawahar Singh 
 Nanu Singh 
 Maan Singh 
 Daya Singh 
 Hari Singh 
 Hira Singh 
 Bahadur Singh 
 Hira Singh 
 Harnam Singh 
 Joginder Singh 
 Hajura Singh 
 Kulwant Singh

Jathedars of Damdami Taksal 

 Baba Deep Singh
 Baba Gurbaksh Singh
 Baba Soorat Singh
 Baba Gurdas Singh
 Baba Sant Singh
 Baba Daya Singh
 Baba Bhagovan Singh
 Baba Harnam Singh Bedi
 Baba Bishan Singh Muralewale
 Baba Sundar Singh Bhindranwale 
 Baba Gurbachan Singh Bhindranwale 
 Baba Kartar Singh Bhindranwal 
 Jarnail Singh Bhindranwale 
 Baba Thakur Singh Bhindranwale 
 Baba Harnam Singh Bhindranwale

Jathedars of Budha Dal

 Nawab Kapur Singh 
 Jassa Singh Ahluwalia 
 Akali Naina Singh 
 Akali Phula Singh 
 Akali Hanuman Singh 
 Akali Prahlad Singh 
 Akali Giana Singh 
 Akali Teja Singh 
 Akali Sahib Singh Kaladhari 
 Akali Chet Singh 
 Akali Santa Singh 
 Akali Surjit Singh 
 Akali Prem Singh 
 Akali Mann Singh

Jathedars of Taruna Dal 

 Deep Singh
 Gurbakhsh Singh
 Sudha Singh
 Karam Singh
 Natha Singh
 Ram Singh Bedi 
 Jassa Singh
 Nand Singh
 Ram Singh
 Gurmukh Singh
 Sadhu Singh
 Bishan Singh
 Kirtan Singh
 Makhan Singh
 Gajjan Singh 
 Joga Singh

Jathedars of Bidhi Chand Dal 

Bidhi Chand Chhina
 Lal Chand
 Gurdial Chand
 Hukam Chand
 Jeoun Singh
 Jaspat Singh
 Bhag Singh
 Labh Singh
 Natha Singh
 Sohan Singh
 Daya Singh Sur Singh 
 Avtar Singh Sur Singh

References

Sikh religious leaders